Trikala Football Club, also known as AO Trikala, is a Greek professional football club based in the city of Trikala, in central Greece. The club currently competes in the Gamma Ethniki, the third tier of Greek football.

History

Formation
The club was formed in 1963 from the merger of two rival Trikala football clubs, Achilleas of Trikala and Α.Ε.Τ. The history of these original clubs can be traced back to the early 1920s when football in the town was starting to rise.

The merger provided an optimistic spirit for the fans of the team since the town's best teams had been merged. Consequently, it proved to be successful as within a year, A.O.T. had won promotion to the Greek first division.

Progress
After coming top in the Greek 2nd division (Beta Ethniki) in 1964, under the Yugoslav coach Stevan Karanfilovic, AOT continued its early success by competing in the Greek 1st division (Alpha Ethniki) from 1964 to 1969 (except for the 1967–68 season when they were relegated to the 2nd division only to come top of that division and be promoted straight away). AOT then spent a further two years in the 2nd division before winning that league again in 1971 and being promoted. They spent a further two years in the 1st division before being relegated to the second division in 1973.

The team spent a further 10 years in the second division and eventually got relegated to the third division (Gamma Ethniki) in 1983. The period between 1983 and 1995 was one of the team's worse, spending 7 of the next 12 years in the 3rd division.

In 1995 AOT re-established themselves in the 2nd division and that success was followed four years later when they won the league and were promoted to the 1st division in 1999 after a 27-year absence.

Unfortunately, the success was short-lived, as AOT came last in the 1999–00 season, which was followed by a disastrous run culminating in their relegation to the 4th division in 2003.

Since 2003 the team have been playing in the Greek 3rd and 4th division until their promotion to the Greek second division in 2010 (Beta Ethniki) after a 9-year absence.

2009–10 season
The most recent season was a particularly memorable one and the most successful season for AOT in a decade. Having won promotion from the Greek 4th Division, AO Trikala were to compete in the Greek National 3d Division North Group. They signed many good and experienced players and set their sights on promotion. The club started the season with a great performance in the Greek Cup as they eliminated Kastoria and went on to play fierce local rivals Anagennisi Karditsas at home. A crowd of over 7,500 Trikala fans saw the home team beat their rivals 1–0, with the goalscorer being Dimosthenis Manousakis. In the 4th round Trikala had another memorable game when they beat top-flight club Iraklis Salonica in front of over 7,000 home fans. They eventually lost on penalties in the next round having progressed to the last 16 of the competition.

Despite the good run in the Greek Cup, the team's league performance at the start of the season suffered as their inability to score away from home meant that Trikala dropped a lot of points. But a 9-game streak of consecutive victories in the end of the season meant that Trikala achieved a second-place finish place, which qualified them for a playoff match against the runners-up of the division.

The playoff match was played on May 29, at the Nea Smirni Stadium in Athens. More than 4000 Trikala fans travelled 7 hours to watch their team produce a memorable display and beat Vyzas Megaron by 2–0, with Costa Rican striker Enoc Perez netting both goals. It was a happy end to the season as AO Trikala had finally started to form a team worthy of its bright history.

The 2009–10 season also saw AO Trikala breaking some impressive records. The team conceded just 11 goals in 35 league games (including the playoff match), which was a European record for the season. Trikala also finished with an impressive home record of 12 wins, 2 draws and 0 losses, while having conceded only 2 goals (a penalty and an own goal). Trikala also were the most attended team in the division, with attendances regularly rising over 4,000.

2010–2013

The team enjoyed on pitch success in the 2010–11 season at the second-tier football league finishing the league in fourth place and becoming eligible for the promotion playoffs to the top tier Super League. The team never had the opportunity to participate in the playoffs as it was disqualified after it emerged that the team had produced counterfeit bank guarantees to prove the team's financial viability. The bank guarantees were a prerequisite for a license to be granted from EPO. The repercussions from the false guarantees did not end there, as the team was relegated to the lowest tier of the Greek football Delta Ethniki.
After further investigations which uncovered extensive irregularities and undeclared debts, the team was expelled from D-Ethniki into non league football. This prompted an angry response from fans towards controversial owner Vangelis Plexidas who the fans held responsible for the predicament of the team.
In 2012 the official supporters of the club named SAKAFLIADES take charges the reborn of the team. The team is going to play in the next to last category of Greek football championships in 2013–14.

Stadium

The Trikala Stadium was built in 1950 and it has a horseshoe-like shape, with no stand behind the west goal. It has a main south stand, which is covered by a roof. The stadium upgraded in 2003, as in that year it hosted the Tsiklitria international athletics Grand Prix.
The Record of Attendance is 20,000 in a 1999 match against PAS Giannina.
It is the home stadium of Trikala F.C. and hosts other events such as concerts and athletics.

Crest and colours

Crest 
The original design of the Trikala F.C. logo represents the merger of the two local rival football teams, Achilleas Trikalon and A.E.T. It was the merger of which Trikala F.C. was established. Since then the crest has changed several times but the original 'Merger Bond' is still featured. In 2009, the chairman Vaggelis Plexidas asked for a new crest so the design resembles the crest of FC Barcelona since the team's main colours are red and blue.

Colours 
Team's main colours are blue and red.

Support
The club is considered by the most popular provincial because of its past, as well as the high average attendance of viewers per meeting. When he successfully fought in the three highest national categories, there were a record of thousands of fans in the stadiums, with AOT vs Panathinaikos 1–2 being the absolute winner on March 12, 1972 (8 months after the final of European Cup at Wembley) 18,231 tickets were available, while the viewers were certainly much more. Unsurprisingly, however, the turnout record occurred in 1999 in the match against PAS Giannina where 20,000 spectators attended. But even when the team was in the Regional Championship, there were meetings that numbered thousands of people. 

Historically, AOT's first organized association of supporters was the Fan Association AO Trikala "Door 4". Now, it has been renamed to a Fan Club Association - "Sakafliades" with a dynamic presence and action on several levels. The precursor of Sakafliades was the unofficial link of the Hobo Boys, who first organized and created a warm atmosphere in AOT matches.

Sponsorship
Shirt Sponsor: Autodeal
Sports Clothing Manufacturer: Givova
Golden Sponsor: FQC

Players

Current squad

Participation history
Super League Greece (7): 1964–1967, 1968–1969, 1971–1973, 1999–2000
Super League Greece 2 (2): 2020–2022
Football League (29): 1963–1964, 1967–1968, 1969–1971, 1973–1983, 1984–1988, 1991–1992, 1995–1999, 2000–2001, 2010–2011, 2015–2020
Gamma Ethniki (13): 1983–1984, 1988–1991, 1992–1995, 2001–2003, 2005–2007, 2009–2010, 2014–2015
Delta Ethniki (2): 2003–2005

Honours

Leagues
Football League Greece
 Winners (5): 1963–64, 1967–68, 1970–71, 1998–99, 2019–20
Gamma Ethniki
 Winners: 2014–15
Delta Ethniki
 Winners: 2004–05, 2008–09

Cups
Gamma Ethniki Cup
 Winners: 2014–15

References

Bibliography
 Αθλητική ιστορία των Τρικάλων - Τόμος Β': ποδόσφαιρο, Βασίλειος Δ. Πελίγκος. 1993, Εκδοτικός Οίκος Φιλολογικού Ιστορικού Λογοτεχνικού Συνδέσμου ΦΙΛΟΣ Τρικάλων (εκτύπωση Κυριακίδη Αφοί), Θεσσαλονίκη,

External links
 Official website
 Fan club website
 Official history and statistics
 goaltrikala.gr sportsnews website ( Daily News, Photos, LIVE Match)

Association football clubs established in 1963
Football clubs in Thessaly
1963 establishments in Greece
Sport in Trikala
Super League Greece 2 clubs